"Servít je vůl" (Servít is an asshole, literally Servít is an ox) is a Czech phrase which became famous as a graffiti. It started to appear in the 1960s as a students' joke in restrooms of bars in Prague. Later, however, it became a part of popular culture and has spread around the world, often in modified wording.

Background
The original inspiration for this phrase is believed to be ex-professor Radim Servít of the Faculty of Civil Engineering of the Czech Technical University in Prague. He taught elasticity and strength of materials in the 1960s and was infamous for his extensive rigour in exams.

Later accounts claim the phrase refers to a different person of the same name.

Time progression and spread 
Students started writing the words "Servít je vůl" on the walls of public restrooms in bars nearby the CTU campus. Thanks to the political mood in the 1960s Czechoslovak Socialist Republic, this graffiti has gradually spread out of Prague, the country and Europe through students and their voices.  These graffiti have prevailed for generations all around the world.

Some of the confirmed locations where this graffiti was found:
 Empire State Building
 Eiffel Tower
 a Milan train station
 a New York City Subway station
 Gerlachovský štít
 a train station in Nesebar, Bulgaria
 restrooms in London
 a corridor of the canteen in the Soviet polar station Mirny in Antarctica

As time progressed, various new versions of the phrase were created, for example: "Doopravdy nejsem vůl, Servít" (I'm really not an asshole, Servít), "Všichni jste volové! Servít" (You are all assholes! Servít), "Promiň Servíte jsou i větší volové" (Sorry Servít, there are bigger assholes than you) and so on.

See also
Kilroy was here
Latrinalia
Srbija do Tokija

References

External links 
 Jiří Reinsberg: Moje archa úmluvy V. – bral jsem život zvesela (přepis záznamu vyprávění na webu christnet.cz) 
 wiki Servít (heslo na wiki ČWUT) 
 Servít je vůl a Kyselák po skalách leze, časopis Speleo, č. 32, 2000, author -wc- 
 Ivan Kolařík: Úvaha o kantorech (Světácké střípky smyslného seniora, díl 16), web Pozitivní noviny, 28. 3. 2007 

Graffiti and unauthorised signage
Czech words and phrases